John Paul McCann  (25 August 1879 – 24 August 1952) was an Irish polo player who competed at the 1908 Summer Olympics. Together with Percy O'Reilly, John Hardress Lloyd and Auston Rotheram, he was a member of the Ireland team that won a silver medal  The Ireland team was part of the Great Britain Olympic team.

References

1879 births
1952 deaths
Members of the Ireland polo team at the 1908 Summer Olympics
Olympic silver medallists for Great Britain
Olympic medalists in polo